, also known as , was a Japanese professional sumo wrestler from Tsukuba, Ibaraki. He was the sport's 34th yokozuna.

Career
He was born . He had lost his father in the Russo-Japanese War at the age of two, and worked as a labourer to support his mother. He made his debut in January 1924 and reached the second highest jūryō division after only six tournaments in January 1927. He initially relied on pushing techniques, or oshi-sumo, but began to develop a more rounded technique after being given instruction by former sekiwake Kiyosegawa.

He was promoted to the top makuuchi division in January 1928. In 1929 Akutsugawa, the wrestler who had discovered him, retired and encouraged him to join his newly established Sadogatake stable. However Takasago's stablemaster, the former ōzeki Asashio Tarō II, did not want his promising rikishi to leave and even changed Minanogawa's shikona to his own of Asashio to obligate him to stay. Eventually a compromise was worked out and Minanogawa divided his time between the two stables.

He made komusubi in January 1930, and had two consecutive runner-up scores in October 1930 and January 1931, the second from the third highest sekiwake rank. Along with the lean and handsome Musashiyama he was one of the most popular men in sumo in this time. However, in 1931 he suffered a series of knee injuries, and in 1932 was caught up in the so-called "Shunjūen Incident", when a number of top division wrestlers went on strike. Minanogawa was out of the Japan Sumo Association for four tournaments and he and his followers held a number of their own rival tournaments with knockout rounds.

He returned to the Sumo Association in 1933 and immediately took his first tournament championship with an unbeaten record, defeating Musashiyama, Shimizugawa and yokozuna Tamanishiki, all of whom had stayed with the Association during the strike. He reverted to the Minanogawa ring name and won his second championship in January 1934. This earned him promotion to ōzeki. He was promoted to yokozuna after a 9–2 runner-up score in January 1936, just one tournament after Musashiyama, and it was suggested that the double promotion was as a result of a deal between the Takasago and Dewanoumi factions.

Although his record at yokozuna rank was not as bad as Musashiyama, who managed only one kachi-koshi winning score as a grand champion, Minanogawa was unable to win any further championships, and was overshadowed by Tamanishiki and the dominant Futabayama. He was never able to beat Futabayama as a yokozuna and had only one win over Tamanishiki. In May 1938 he could win only six out of 13 bouts, and became one of the very few yokozuna to compete in a full tournament and turn in a make-koshi losing score. By 1941 he was 36 years old and suffering from injuries, and he wanted to retire, but was asked to stay on until Maedayama or Akinoumi were ready to replace him. He eventually retired in January 1942, a tournament in which Akinoumi produced a strong 13–2 record.

Retirement from sumo

Minanogawa had been able to stay in sumo as an elder due to his yokozuna ranking, but he had lost interest in sumo. He had recently married and started a family, and had also done a law and economics degree at Waseda University. He decided to resign from the Sumo Association (an irreversible decision) and run for election to parliament. However he lost badly and used up most of his severance pay from the Sumo Association. He also lost money through gambling. He tried a succession of unsuccessful jobs and even had a bit part in a 1958 Hollywood film called The Barbarian and the Geisha. He was eventually divorced from his wife and separated from his children, and in his later years was confined to a rest home and reliant on hand outs from fans and sumo officials. He died in 1971, largely forgotten by the general public.

Career record
In 1927 Tokyo and Osaka sumo merged and four tournaments a year in Tokyo and other locations began to be held.

  
    
    
  
  
    
    
  
  
    
    
  

  
    
    
    
    
  
  
    
    
    
    
  

    
    
    
    
  
  
    
    
    
    
  

    
    
    
    
  

    
    
    
    
  

    
    
    
  

    
    
    
  
  
    
    
    
  
  
    
    
    
  
  
    
    
    
  
  
    
    
    
  
  
    
    
    
  
  
    
    
    
  
  
    
    
    
  
  
    
  

''Minanogawa, along with many others, was expelled from the Sumo Association for striking.  He was allowed to return to the top division for the 1933 Spring tournament but unranked. He still managed to take the championship.

See also
Glossary of sumo terms
List of past sumo wrestlers
List of sumo tournament top division champions
List of yokozuna

References

External links

Japan Sumo Association profile

1903 births
1971 deaths
Japanese sumo wrestlers
Sumo people from Ibaraki Prefecture
Yokozuna
Japanese sportsperson-politicians